Sir Steven Geoffrey Redgrave  (born 23 March 1962) is a British retired rower who won gold medals at five consecutive Olympic Games from 1984 to 2000. He has also won three Commonwealth Games gold medals and nine World Rowing Championships golds. He is the most successful male rower in Olympic history, and the only man to have won gold medals at five Olympic Games in an endurance sport.

Redgrave is regarded as one of Britain's greatest-ever Olympians. As of 2016 he was the fourth-most decorated British Olympian, after cyclists Sir Chris Hoy, Sir Jason Kenny and Sir Bradley Wiggins. He has carried the British flag at the opening of the Olympic Games on two occasions. In 2002, he was ranked number 36 in the BBC poll of the 100 Greatest Britons. He received the BBC Sports Personality of the Year – Lifetime Achievement Award in 2011.

Early life and education

Redgrave was born in Marlow, Buckinghamshire, to Geoffrey Edward Redgrave, a submariner in the Second World War who became a builder, and Sheila Marion, daughter of Harold Stevenson, a local bus driver. His great-grandparents Harry and Susannah Redgrave moved to Marlow from Bramfield, Suffolk, in 1887. He was educated at Great Marlow School.

Rowing career
Redgrave's primary discipline was sweep rowing, in which he won Olympic Gold rowing both bowside and strokeside (port and starboard).

From 1991, the crews in which he rowed became renowned for their consistent dominance, winning almost every time they raced.

For much of his career he suffered illness: in 1992 he was diagnosed with ulcerative colitis, and in 1997 he was diagnosed with diabetes mellitus type 2.

Olympic games
Redgrave won gold medals at five consecutive Olympic Games from 1984 to 2000, plus a bronze medal at the 1988 Summer Olympics.

Immediately after winning the 1996 Olympic Gold Medal, he stated that if anyone found him close to a rowing boat again, they could shoot him. However, he changed his mind shortly afterward, and resumed training after a four-month break. The gold medal achieved by him and Matthew Pinsent in the coxless pair at the Atlanta 1996 games was particularly notable for being the only gold medal achieved by the entire British Olympic team across all sports during that particular Olympic games.

In 2000, he won his fifth consecutive Olympic Gold Medal and retired from the sport. In August 2000, prior to his final Olympic Games, the BBC broadcast Gold Fever, a three-part BBC documentary which had followed the coxless four in the years leading up to the Olympics. It included video diaries recording the highs and lows in the quest for gold. At the medal ceremony after the 2000 Summer Olympics he was also presented with a gold Olympic pin by IOC President Juan Antonio Samaranch in recognition of his achievement.

World Championships
At the World Rowing Championships he won nine gold medals, two silvers, and a bronze.

He won the World Championship for Indoor rowing in 1991.

Henley Royal Regatta
He competed at Henley Royal Regatta for more than two decades, winning: the Silver Goblets & Nickalls' Challenge Cup for coxless pairs seven times (twice with Andy Holmes, once with Simon Berrisford and four times with Matthew Pinsent); the Stewards' Challenge Cup for coxless fours five times; the Diamond Challenge Sculls twice; the Double Sculls Challenge Cup with Eric Sims then with Adam Clift; and the Queen Mother Challenge Cup for quadruple sculls.

Wingfield Sculls
He won the Wingfield Sculls for single scullers five times between 1985 and 1989.

Life after rowing
In April 2006 Redgrave completed his third London Marathon, raising a record £1,800,000 for charity.

He starred in Top Ground Gear Force for Sport Relief in 2008, where the Top Gear Team (Jeremy Clarkson, James May and Richard Hammond) took on Ground Force with predictable results, and trashed his garden.

He launched his own Fairtrade Cotton Brand of clothing called FiveG, which is sold in Debenhams department stores.

He was involved in starting a rowing academy in India at Lavasa, the new Hill City being developed near Pune City.

In April 2008, Redgrave took part in the Olympic Torch relay for the games in Beijing, and he went on to be one of the final torch-bearers for the 2012 Summer Olympics in London, carrying the torch into the stadium, where seven young athletes shared the task of lighting the cauldron at the opening ceremony.

He was named a Patron of the Jaguar Academy of Sport in 2010.

In 2012, he took up kayaking and attempted the Devizes-to-Westminster marathon kayak race, but had to withdraw halfway through due to tiredness.

He rowed on the Gloriana as part of the royal pageant for the Diamond Jubilee of Elizabeth II.

In August 2014, Redgrave was one of 200 public figures who were signatories to a letter to The Guardian expressing their hope that Scotland would vote to remain part of the United Kingdom in September's referendum on that issue.

In May 2018, Redgrave assumed the High-Level Performance Director role for the Chinese Rowing Association to help China's rowing team's target of one gold medal at the Tokyo 2020 Games and two golds at Paris 2024.

Personal life

He married Ann Callaway (now Ann, Lady Redgrave) in 1988; also an elite rower, she represented Great Britain in the women's eight at the Los Angeles Olympics in 1984. She was Chief Medical Officer to the GB rowing team from 1992 to 2001 and since 2009 their first full-time Medical Officer. He was the honorary president of British Rowing.

Redgrave has three children, Natalie, Sophie and Zak. Natalie rowed with the Oxford University Women's Boat Club which won the women's boat race at Henley Boat Races in 2011.

He is a supporter of Chelsea Football Club.

Honours

Redgrave was made a Member of the Order of the British Empire (MBE) in 1987, and promoted to Commander of the Order of the British Empire (CBE) in 1997. In the 2001 New Year Honours he was appointed a Knight Bachelor "for services to Rowing", which he received in Buckingham Palace from Queen Elizabeth II on 1 May 2001.

He was voted the BBC Sports Personality of the Year in 2000, and received the BBC Sports – Lifetime Achievement Award in 2011.

He was awarded the Honorary Degree of Doctor of the University from Heriot Watt University in November 2001, having previously been awarded an Honorary Blue in 1997.

In 2000, his fifth Olympic gold was voted the greatest sporting moment in Channel 4's 100 Greatest Sporting Moments.

The Redgrave Pinsent Rowing Lake was opened by him and Matthew Pinsent in 2006. The lake and boathouse provide training, medical and scientific facilities for the GB rowing squad.

In 2013, he was awarded an honorary doctorate by the University of Edinburgh "in recognition of his outstanding sporting achievements and role as a sports ambassador".

Achievements
 Olympic medals: 5 gold, 1 bronze
 World Championship medals: 9 gold, 2 silver, 1 bronze
 Junior World Championship medals: 1 silver

Olympic Games
 2000 – Gold, Coxless Four (with Matthew Pinsent, Tim Foster, James Cracknell)
 1996 – Gold, Coxless Pair (with Matthew Pinsent)
 1992 – Gold, Coxless Pair (with Matthew Pinsent)
 1988 – Gold, Coxless Pair (with Andy Holmes)
 1988 – Bronze, Coxed Pair (with Andy Holmes and Patrick Sweeney)
 1984 – Gold, Coxed Four (with Martin Cross, Adrian Ellison, Andy Holmes and Richard Budgett).

World Rowing Championships

 1999 – Gold, Coxless Four (with James Cracknell, Ed Coode, Matthew Pinsent)
 1998 – Gold, Coxless Four (with James Cracknell, Tim Foster, Matthew Pinsent)
 1997 – Gold, Coxless Four (with James Cracknell, Tim Foster, Matthew Pinsent)
 1995 – Gold, Coxless Pair (with Matthew Pinsent)
 1994 – Gold, Coxless Pair (with Matthew Pinsent)
 1993 – Gold, Coxless Pair (with Matthew Pinsent)
 1991 – Gold, Coxless Pair (with Matthew Pinsent)
 1990 – Bronze, Coxless Pair (with Matthew Pinsent)
 1989 – Silver, Coxless Pairs (with Simon Berrisford)
 1989 – 5th, Coxed Pairs (with Simon Berrisford and Patrick Sweeney)
 1987 – Gold, Coxless Pairs (with Andy Holmes)
 1987 – Silver, Coxed Pairs (with Andy Holmes and Patrick Sweeney)
 1986 – Gold, Coxed Pairs (with Andy Holmes and Patrick Sweeney)
 1985 – 12th, Single Sculls
 1983 – Single Sculls
 1982 – 6th, Quadruple Scull
 1981 – 8th, Quadruple Scull

Junior World Rowing Championships
 1980 – Silver, Double Sculls
 1979 – Single Sculls

Henley Royal Regatta

 2001 – Queen Mother Challenge Cup
 2000 – Stewards' Challenge Cup
 1999 – Stewards' Challenge Cup
 1998 – Stewards' Challenge Cup
 1997 – Stewards' Challenge Cup
 1995 – Silver Goblets & Nickalls' Challenge Cup
 1994 – Silver Goblets & Nickalls' Challenge Cup
 1993 – Stewards' Challenge Cup
 1993 – Silver Goblets & Nickalls' Challenge Cup
 1991 – Silver Goblets & Nickalls' Challenge Cup
 1989 – Silver Goblets & Nickalls' Challenge Cup
 1987 – Silver Goblets & Nickalls' Challenge Cup
 1986 – Silver Goblets & Nickalls' Challenge Cup
 1985 – Diamond Challenge Sculls
 1983 – Diamond Challenge Sculls
 1982 – Double Sculls Challenge Cup
 1981 – Double Sculls Challenge Cup

Other
 1996 – Winner of Celebrity Gladiators
 2000 – BBC Sports Personality of the Year
 2001 – Collected a knighthood from Queen Elizabeth II
 2001 – Received an Honorary Doctorate from Heriot-Watt University
 2010 – Awarded the degree of Hon. LLD from the University of St Andrews
 2011 – BBC Sports – Lifetime Achievement Award
 2012 – Carried the London 2012 Olympic Torch into the Olympic Stadium
 2013 – Awarded an honorary doctorate by the University of Edinburgh "in recognition of his outstanding sporting achievements and role as a sports ambassador".

Bibliography

 Steve Redgrave: A Golden age (2000) with Nick Townsend (ghostwriter). 
 2nd edition: 2001 
 Steve Redgrave's Complete Book of Rowing (1992). 
 2nd edition: 1995 
 You Can Win At Life! (2005) with Nick Townsend. .
 Inspired (2009). 
 Foreword to Diabetes: The at Your Fingertips Guide 5th edition (2003)

See also
 Jack Beresford, rower, Britain's most successful Olympian prior to Redgrave's fourth gold medal, with three gold and two silver medals from 1920 to 1936
 List of multiple Olympic gold medalists
 List of multiple Olympic gold medalists in one event
 List of people diagnosed with ulcerative colitis

References

External links

 
 
 
 
 
 
 
 Virtual Library rowing information
 Marlow information 
 Video 1988 Pair (2-) Olympic race
 Video Sir Steve Redgrave discusses the key to a winning team
 Sir Steve Redgrave: myplace ambassador – creating places for young people to go to(video)
 The Sonshine of Our Lives: Sheila Redgrave tells the broader story of her son Sir Steve Redgrave
 Motion in Action Inspirational Story on Steve Redgrave

English male rowers
Commonwealth Games gold medallists for England
Olympic rowers of Great Britain
Rowers at the 1984 Summer Olympics
Rowers at the 1988 Summer Olympics
Rowers at the 1992 Summer Olympics
Rowers at the 1996 Summer Olympics
Rowers at the 2000 Summer Olympics
BBC Sports Personality of the Year winners
Deputy Lieutenants of Buckinghamshire
Laureus World Sports Awards winners
Knights Bachelor
People educated at Great Marlow School
People in sports awarded knighthoods
Commanders of the Order of the British Empire
1962 births
Living people
Stewards of Henley Royal Regatta
Members of Leander Club
Olympic gold medallists for Great Britain
People from Marlow, Buckinghamshire
Rowers at the 1986 Commonwealth Games
Olympic medalists in rowing
Medalists at the 2000 Summer Olympics
Medalists at the 1996 Summer Olympics
Medalists at the 1992 Summer Olympics
Medalists at the 1988 Summer Olympics
Medalists at the 1984 Summer Olympics
Olympic bronze medallists for Great Britain
World Rowing Championships medalists for Great Britain
Commonwealth Games medallists in rowing
Thomas Keller Medal recipients
BBC Sports Personality Lifetime Achievement Award recipients
People with type 2 diabetes
Medallists at the 1986 Commonwealth Games